The 1979–80 New Jersey Nets season was the Nets' fourth season in the NBA.

Draft picks

 Not to be confused with the 1990s basketball player Tony Smith.

Roster

Regular season

Season standings

z - clinched division title
y - clinched division title
x - clinched playoff spot

Record vs. opponents

Game log

Player statistics

Awards and records

Transactions

References

See also
 1979-80 NBA season

New Jersey Nets season
New Jersey Nets seasons
New Jersey Nets
New Jersey Nets
Piscataway, New Jersey